Up in Mabel's Room may refer to:

 Up in Mabel's Room (play), a 1919 play written by Wilson Collison and Otto Harbach
 Up in Mabel's Room (1926 film), a 1926 silent film based on the play starring Marie Prevost
 Up in Mabel's Room (1944 film), a 1944 film remake of the 1926 film starring Marjorie Reynolds 
"Up in Mabel's Room", a song by the Everly Brothers from their 1971 album Stories We Could Tell